Patri Satish Kumar is an Indian Carnatic musician and composer, who is an exponent of the Mridangam, an Indian percussion instrument. He has been conferred with the prestigious Sangeet Natak Akademy award by the Government of India in the year 2020. He has also received an Honorary Doctorate from the University of Berkeley, California for his outstanding endeavors in the field of Mridangam and for his special innovations and immense contribution to world music. Patri is also the recipient of the Global Peace Award for the year 2018 from the Universal Socio Cultural Association in collaboration with Philanthropic Society India – International.

Early life
Patri was born into a family immersed in the world of Carnatic music on the 3rd of August, 1970 to Sri Kesava Rao and Smt. Padmavathi Kesava Rao. Being a third generation musician, he was introduced to the mridangam at the age of 3 by his mother Smt. Padmavathi, a renowned violinist from Vizianagaram. He gave his very first public performance at the tender age of 7. His training was under three legendary gurus – R. Sree Ramachandramurthy, V.A. Swamy and V. Narasimham.

Career
An “A-Top” graded artist of the All India Radio and Doordarshan with a rich concert experience of over 47 years, Patri has created his own style of playing which has influenced the younger generation to a great extent. His specialty is the fine balance between the treble and bass heads, which when played in unison creates an exhilarating experience for the listeners. Over the years, he has evolved a style of his own which blends seamlessly with various instruments and voices, alike. A fine performer, composer and guru, Patri has brought new dimensions to the world of rhythm by reinventing "Yathi Praana Talas", “Kshetra Talas” & various other talas like "Misra Misrachapu" and so on. His solos in “Shanka Talam”, “Senavathi Talam” and “Sankeerna Chapu” have garnered wide appreciation and praise.

He has conceived a new concept titled “GAJAANA” - the ‘Gathi’, ‘Jaathi’ and ‘Nadai’ concept. He also introduced a path-breaking concept to the field of percussion through a blend of both Hindustani and Carnatic styles of playing. In this concept, the first half is played with a traditional Lehra, played from Vilambita to Dhrta, followed with the addition of Carnatic percussion. This entire concept adds a new dimension to Indian Classical percussion which Patri refers to as “Tradition to Addition”. 

Patri has redefined the look of the mridangam with his innovative ideas and is the proud creator of the “Designer Mridangams”, which meets all traditional values along with a contemporary classy look, garnering worldwide appreciation. These designer mridangams inspired Patri to upgrade his existing innovation into the new and revolutionary 2-part “TRI-M Designer Mridangam”, which has been appreciated by musicians and audience at large. His maiden book, “PATRI…001 SIR (South Indian Rhythms)” features new age korvais (finishings) which was published in the year 2020 for the benefit of young professionals.
 
With an intent of giving back to the world of rhythm, Patri organizes his own music festival known as the Patri Drum Festival (PDF) – which features legendary and established percussionists. Patri’s distinct style has inspired the younger generation of artists in the field of percussion and many of his students are active performers, making a name for themselves.
He has performed in some of the greatest venues across the world which include the Rashtrapati Bhavan, New Delhi (in the presence of the Ex-President of India, Smt. Pratibha Patil), Kennedy Centre (Washington DC), Lincoln Hall (Chicago), Royal Albert Hall (London), South Bank Center (London), The Menuhin Hall (Surrey), Music Academy (Chennai), NCPA Tata Theatre (Mumbai),  Sydney Opera House (Sydney), Paul Getty Hall (Los Angeles), Théâtre de la Ville (Paris) and many more. He has performed at prestigious music festivals such as Festival of France, Miami Beachfront Festival, Madrid Jazz Festival, India Gate Festival, and Harbourfront Festival. He has been a part of many musical confluences in Classical, Fusion and Jazz genres. His performances have been featured in many national and international broadcasts such as Radio France, Radio Germany, Radio South Africa, All India Radio and Ceylon Radio.

Patri has been blessed to have performed in the presence of some of the great saints of India such as Kanchi, Udupi and Sringeri Mutt Peethadhipathis and so on. He is fortunate to have performed in many Spiritual Congregations including Brahmotsavams & Kumbhabhishekams of the ancient most temples of India, and Kumbhamelas & Pushakara Festivals of rivers Ganga, Godavari, Krishna and Kaveri.

Awards and Achievements

 Mridanga Soori title - Sree Kacchapi Kalakshethram, Sreekakulam - 31st Jan, 2023
 Mridanga Saarvabhouma title - Shri Vaaraahi Vedashastra Sangeeta Seva Trust, Hyderabad - 7th Jan, 2023
 Sangeeta Natak Akademy Award – 2020
 Honorary Doctorate from University of Berkley, California – 2019
 Vishwa Nadha Sagara title – Sampoornam Foundation, Chennai – 2019
 April 5th declared as "SATISH KUMAR PATRI DAY" by the Mayor of the city of Tempe, Arizona - 2019
 Shaarada Puraskar from Sringeri Sharada Peetham - 2019
 Global Peace Award from the Universal Socio Cultural Association in collaboration with Philanthropic Society India – International - 2018
 March 26th declared as "SATISH KUMAR PATRI DAY" by the Mayor of the city of Houston, Texas - 2018
 Vocational Excellence Award from the Rotary Club of Chennai for his contributions to the field of music (percussion) – 2017
 Sunada Sudhanidhi title - ‘Gayaka Sarvabhouma’ Sangeeta Parishat, Vijayawada – 2016  
 Lifetime Achievement Award from Shanti Arts Foundation and Endowments, Chennai – 2014
 Mridanga Nadha Mani title – Kanchi Paramacharya Peetham, Kanchipuram
 Asthana Vidwan of Tirunelveli Shakti Peetham from 2008
 Navayuga Nandi title – Sri Siddha Bala Peetam, Kallidaikurichi - 2008
 Asthana Vidwan of Kanchi Kamakoti Peetham from 2006

References

1970 births
Living people
Musicians from Andhra Pradesh
Mridangam players
Indian male classical musicians
People from Vizianagaram
21st-century drummers
21st-century male musicians
Recipients of the Sangeet Natak Akademi Award